Foundation Day is a designated date on which celebrations mark the founding of a nation, state or a creation of a military unit. The term overlaps with national days.

Background
Older countries that use some other event of special significance as their national day. This signals the use of a "class" of National Days, that are equally important in the foundation of the nation, and a "class" of less important official public holidays. This holiday can be symbolised by the date of becoming republic or a significant date for a patron saint or a ruler (birthday, accession, removal, etc.) as the starting point of the nation's history. Often the day is not called "Foundation Day" but serves and can be considered as one.

Examples

Asia
 Double Ten Day: outbreak of the Wuchang Uprising China and founding of the Republic of China (1911)
 Gaecheonjeol: (English- National Foundation Day) public holiday in South Korea Also, celebrating the creation of Modern-day Korea in the year 2333 BCE
 Hong Kong Foundation Day on 26 January, the anniversary of the founding of Hong Kong as a British colony (until 1997)
 National Foundation Day, national holiday in Japan, celebrating the founding of the nation and the imperial line by its first emperor
 Republic Day in India: becoming the first republic in the British Commonwealth of Nations, 1950
 Saudi National Day: the end of the 30-year campaign to unite the central Arabian lands to found the modern state, 1932
 Day of the Foundation of the Republic (North Korea): commemorates the foundation of the DPRK in 1948

Australasia
 Foundation Day, one of the precursors of Australia Day, celebrating the day the First Fleet landed at Sydney 1788 (also used separately to mark the foundation of two states)
 Norfolk Island Foundation Day on Norfolk Island on March 6, commemorating the First Fleet settlement under Philip Gidley King in 1788
 Western Australia Day, a public holiday in Western Australia held on the first Monday in June, formerly known as Foundation Day

Europe
 German Unity Day: unification of West Germany and East Germany and the foundation of the modern German state, 1990
 Statehood Day (Lithuania): commemorates coronation of the first king, Mindaugas
 Swiss National Day: alliance of Uri, Schwyz and Unterwalden against the Holy Roman Empire and the foundation of the Swiss state, 1291

See also
National day

References

Types of national holidays